Pavel Khamidulin (born 2 October 1971) is a Russian cyclist. He competed in the men's points race at the 1996 Summer Olympics.

References

1971 births
Living people
Russian male cyclists
Olympic cyclists of Russia
Cyclists at the 1996 Summer Olympics
Cyclists from Moscow